East Sweden is a NUTS 1 region in Sweden. The region is defined and used by the European Union for statistical purposes, it is not used as a region by Sweden which uses other divisions of the country.

Subdivision
There are two subdivisions of East Sweden called National Areas of Sweden (NUTS 2). They are in turn comprised out of six different counties (NUTS 3).
 SE11 Stockholm
 Stockholm County acts as a NUTS 2 and 3 region
 SE12 East Middle Sweden 
 Östergötland County
 Uppsala County
 Örebro County
 Västmanland County
 Södermanland County

Economy
Eurostat estimated the regional nominal GDP to be € 206,003 million and the nominal GDP per capita to be €53,600 in a 2015 study. The same study also showed that the region had a 45% higher GDP per capita than the EU average.

See also
 First-level NUTS of the European Union
 NUTS statistical regions of Sweden
 Lands of Sweden

References 

NUTS 1 statistical regions of the European Union
Geography of Sweden